Le Baptême is the first studio album by French rock musician -M-. It was recorded in 1997 and issued in 1998. The alter ego of Matthieu Chedid, the character -M- had come to prominence as a supporting act opening for the then chart-topping French folk rock band Louise Attaque.

Track listing

 La Fleur
 Le Baptême
 L'Amour ma thématique
 Nostalgic du cool
 Manque de Q
 Je suis une cigarette
 La Mort de l'âme
 Pick pocket
 Les Acariens
 Le Rose pourpre du cœur
 Coup de vent
 Le temps mue
 Matchistador
 Souviens-toi
 Souvenir du futur
 Machistador (extended)
 Céline attendue

References

1997 debut albums